Saros may refer to:
 Saros (astronomy), an 18-year period, across which lunar and solar eclipses repeat
 Saros (Nigeria), descendants of free slaves from Sierra Leone who migrated to Nigeria
 SS Saros, a shipwreck off the southeast coast of Australia
 SAROS, a wave-powered desalination technology

People 
 Juuse Saros (born 1995), Finnish professional ice hockey goaltender for the Nashville Predators

Places 
 Botaş Saros FSRU Terminal, an LNG terminal in the Gulf of Saros, Turkey
 Saros (Greece), an ancient city-state in the Aegean Sea
 Saros (island), an island in the Aegean Sea
 Gulf of Saros, an inlet of the Aegean Sea
 Sáros county, a former division (vármegye) of the Kingdom of Hungary
 Šariš, a historical region of Slovakia, encompassing the territory of the former Sáros county
 Șoarș, Brașov County, a commune in Romania
 Șaroș pe Târnave, a village in Dumbrăveni town, Sibiu County, Romania
 Saroș, a tributary of the Bâsca in Covasna County, Romania
 Șaroș, a tributary of the Tisza in Maramureș County, Romania
 The ancient name of the Seyhan River, Turkey